Maple Lake can refer to a location in North America:

Canada
Maple Lake (Lunenburg),  a lake of Chester Municipal District in Nova Scotia
Maple Lake (Halifax, Nova Scotia), a lake in the Halifax Regional Municipality
Maple Lake (Pictou),  a lake of Pictou County, in Nova Scotia
Maple Lake (Ontario), a lake in Haliburton County

United States
 Maple Lake, Minnesota, a small city
 Maple Lake Township, Wright County, Minnesota
 Maple Lake (Douglas County, Minnesota), a lake
 Maple Lake (Polk County), Minnesota, a lake
 Maple Lake (Wright County, Minnesota), a lake